The use of cannabis as a recreational drug has been outlawed in many countries for several decades. As a result of long-fought legalization efforts, several countries such as Uruguay and Canada, as well as several states in the US, have legalized the production, sale, possession, and recreational and/or medical usage of cannabis. The broad legalization of cannabis in this fashion can have numerous effects on the economy and society in which it is legalized.

Region

Canada 
See Cannabis in Canada.

United States

A 2015 study found that medical marijuana legalization increased use and abuse by those under and over the age of 21. A 2017 study found that frequency of marijuana use by students increased significantly after recreational legalization and that increase was especially large for females and for Black and Hispanic students.

A 2017 study found that the introduction of medical marijuana laws caused a reduction in violent crime in Americans states that border Mexico: "The reduction in crime is strongest for counties close to the border (less than 350km), and for crimes that relate to drug trafficking. In addition, we find that [medical marijuana laws] in inland states lead to a reduction in crime in the nearest border state. Our results are consistent with the theory that decriminalization of the production and distribution of marijuana leads to a reduction in violent crime in markets that are traditionally controlled by Mexican drug trafficking organisations."

A 2020 study found that junk food sales increased between 3.2 and 4.5 percent in states that had legalized cannabis.

A 2022 study found that legalization had led to a 20% increase in use of cannabis in the US.

Pharmaceutical companies had lower returns.

Colorado

In Colorado, effects since 2014 include increased state revenues, violent crime decreased, and an increase in homeless population. One Colorado hospital has received a 15% increase in babies born with THC in their blood.

Since legalization, public health and law enforcement officials in Colorado have grappled with a number of issues, serving as a model for policy problems that come with legalization. Marijuana-related hospital visits have nearly doubled between 2011, prior to legalization, and 2014. Top public health administrators in Colorado have cited the increased potency of today's infused products, often referred to as "edibles", as a cause for concern. They have also highlighted the risk that edibles pose to children, as they are often undistinguishable from ordinary foods once they are removed from their packaging. Youth usage has also been a major aspect of the debate surrounding marijuana legalization and a concern for state officials. Overall youth usage rates have increased, although not enough to be deemed statistically significant. Looking at students in the eighth, tenth, and twelfth grades, a survey study published in the Journal of the American Medical Association found that usage rates had not increased among any of the different age groups in Colorado, although statistically significant increases in usage rates amongst eighth and tenth graders were reported in Washington.

Oregon
Oregon legalized cannabis in November 2014. Effects have included an increase in cannabis-related calls to the Oregon state poison center, an increase in perception among youth that Marijuana use is harmful, a decrease in arrest rates for cannabis related offenses, stores sold $250 million in cannabis products which resulted in $70  million in state tax revenue (higher than a predicted $36 million in revenue), 10% decrease in violent crime, and 13% drop in murder rate.

Washington D.C.
Washington D.C. legalized cannabis in 2015. Cannabis possession arrests decreased 98% from 2014 to 2015 and all cannabis offenses dropped by 85%.

Uruguay
Effects of cannabis legalization in Uruguay since 2013 include other countries in the region loosening laws concerning cannabis and lower costs of illegal cannabis. The percentage of female prisoners has fallen.

See also

 Cannabis rights
 Drug liberalization
 Drug Policy Alliance
 Green rush
 Harm reduction
 Legality of cannabis by country
 Legality of cannabis
 Legality of the War on Drugs
 National Organization for the Reform of Marijuana Laws
 White market

References

Further reading

Cannabis law
Cannabis
Cannabis smoking
Drug control law
Entheogens
Euphoriants
Herbalism
Medicinal plants
Hemp
Biofuels
Fiber plants
Herbs
Non-food crops